Isín (Spanish pronunciation: [is'in]) is a locality belonging to the municipality of Sabiñánigo (Alto Gállego, Huesca, Aragon, Spain). In 2019, it had a population of 5 inhabitants.

A standalone municipality in the 1842 census, it was annexed by Acumuer before the 1857 census.

References 

 Populated places in the Province of Huesca
Former municipalities in Spain